Kirsty Applebaum is an English children's author.

Biography
Applebaum was born in Essex and grew up in Hampshire. Her working life included railway re-signalling and teaching Pilates, as well as menial jobs. She graduated from Bath Spa University's MA in Writing for Young People in 2017.

Writing
Her debut novel, The Middler, was published by Nosy Crow in 2019 and was shortlisted for the Waterstones Children's Book Prize and the UKLA Book Award.
It was followed by Troofriend (2020) and The Life and Time of Lonnie Quicke (2021).

In 2022, she began a series of Princess Minna books for children aged 4+, with illustrator Sahar Haghgoo.

Published works

Princess Minna series for younger readers

References

External links
 

Living people
English children's writers
21st-century English women writers
Writers from Essex
Year of birth missing (living people)